The Owners is a 2020 horror thriller film adapted from the graphic novel Une nuit de pleine lune by Hermann and Yves H. Directed and co-written by Julius Berg in his feature film directorial debut, the film stars Maisie Williams, Sylvester McCoy, Rita Tushingham, Jake Curran, Ian Kenny and Andrew Ellis.

An international co-production of the United States, United Kingdom, and France, The Owners was released in the US on September 4, 2020, by RLJE Films.

Plot
Gaz, Nathan, and Terry have decided to break into the home of  Dr. Richard Huggins and his wife Ellen, as it's in the countryside and is said to have a very large safe full of cash. Nathan's girlfriend Mary complicates matters when she arrives to retrieve her car to go to work, but she is persuaded to come along. She enters the house after the boys fail to access the safe, as she had been waiting for a long while.

Once inside, she tells Nathan that she's pregnant. When the Hugginses return, the boys tie the couple up and try to threaten them into opening the safe. In the process Richard recognizes Nathan and Terry from when they were children, causing Nathan to become reluctant to continue the theft. In an attempt to take control Gaz picks a fight with Nathan and stabs him. He then tries to hurt Ellen, only for Mary to kill him with a sledgehammer. As she and Terry untie the couple, Ellen seems to recognize Mary.

Richard tricks Terry and Mary by offering to operate on Nathan and pretending to call for an ambulance. Ellen then secretly drugs Terry, who hallucinates Mary's twin sister Jane, who went missing a few months back and is presumed to have run away. Mary realizes that they've been tricked. Richard tries to persuade her and Terry to drink tea with them, during which they discuss the untimely death of the couple's daughter, Kate, years prior, as well as the mysterious disappearances of numerous teenage girls in the area. Now aware of the danger the couple poses, Mary tries unsuccessfully to escape. She and Terry make it to the garage, only for Terry to shoot Mary in the back.

As she bleeds out, Richard taunts Mary about her impending death, despite acknowledging that she saved him and his wife from Gaz. He also tells her that he and his wife have kidnapped and imprisoned several girls in their safe, which is actually a vault where they would dress them up as little girls and call them "Kate". It's insinuated that the girls who didn't work out were killed and disposed of. The most recent girl they kidnapped, however, did fit the role. And when Richard opens the vault it's revealed that Mary's sister, Jane, is inside. Mary finally succumbs to blood loss, with the last thing she sees being her long lost sister in chains. As a reward for helping them, the Hugginses imprison Terry inside the vault with Jane.

The film ends with Terry's mother discussing her son's disappearance with the Hugginses, unaware of the couple's involvement and the presence of Mary's freshly buried corpse in the garden, presumably alongside Gaz and Nathan.

Cast
 Maisie Williams as Mary / Jane Vorrel
 Sylvester McCoy as Dr. Richard Huggins
 Rita Tushingham as Ellen Huggins
 Jake Curran as Gaz
 Ian Kenny as Nathan
 Andrew Ellis as Terry
 Stacha Hicks as Jean

Production
In February 2019, it was announced that Maisie Williams had been cast for the film. In May 2019, Jake Curran, Ian Kenny, Andrew Ellis, Sylvester McCoy, Rita Tushingham and Stacha Hicks joined the cast.

Principal photography began in May 2019. Filming took place in an isolated Victorian mansion in Kent, near London.

Director and co-writer Julius Berg, speaking of the film's themes, stated that, "in a way, it's a bit of an anti-capitalist movie. When you're poor you have less of a chance to survive."

Release
In April 2020, RLJE Films acquired distribution rights to the film. It was released in the United States on September 4, 2020.

Reception

Critical response
The website's critics consensus reads: "The Owners will prove excessively mean-spirited and over the top for some, but should be just pulpy enough for genre enthusiasts up for some home-invasion thrillers." Metacritic reports a score of 53 out of 100 based on four critic reviews, indicating "mixed or average reviews".

References

External links
 

2020 films
2020 horror thriller films
American horror thriller films
British horror thriller films
English-language French films
French horror thriller films
Home invasions in film
Films shot in Kent
Films set in the 1990s
Films based on Belgian comics
Live-action films based on comics
Films set in England
2020s English-language films
2020s American films
2020s British films
2020s French films